Music from Mars is a 1955 Czechoslovak comedy film directed by Ján Kadár and Elmar Klos. The film starred Josef Kemr.

References

External links
 

1955 films
Czechoslovak comedy films
1950s Czech-language films
Films directed by Ján Kadár
Czech comedy films
1950s Czech films